The 1911–12 British Home Championship was a football competition played between the British Home Nations during the second half of the 1911–12 season. England and Scotland shared the title after both beat Wales and Ireland and then drew the deciding match at Hampden Park. Ireland took third place after beating Wales in an exciting 3–2 win away in Cardiff. Wales, who came last with zero points, lost all three matches and conceded six goals.

England began the competition with a 6–1 thrashing of Ireland in Dublin, giving them the immediate advantage and making them favourites for the title, having won four of the previous five tournaments. Scotland too began with a win, a more subdued 1–0 victory over the Welsh. Scotland followed this with a 4–1 win in Belfast, briefly taking the top of the table before England joined them by beating Wales 2–0 in Wrexham. In the deciding game in Glasgow, Scotland and England played out a tough 1–1 draw. As neither side had broken the deadlock, both shared the tournament. In the final match, Wales and Ireland played a gripping game for third place, the Irish taking it by a single goal.

Table

Results

Winning squads

References

1912 in British sport
1912
1911–12 in Scottish football
1911–12 in English football
Brit
Brit